Francesco Panfilo (born November 23, 1942 in Vilminore di Scalve) is an Italian clergyman and bishop for the Roman Catholic Diocese of Alotau-Sideia in Papua New Guinea. He was appointed Bishop of Alotau-Sideia in 2001, and Coadjutor Archbishop of Rabaul in 2011. He became Archbishop of Rabaul in 2012.

He retired in 2020, intending to spend his retirement in the Philippines.

References 

1942 births
Italian Roman Catholic bishops
Roman Catholic bishops of Alotau-Sideia
Roman Catholic archbishops of Rabaul
Living people